German submarine U-354 was a Type VIIC U-boat of Nazi Germany's Kriegsmarine during World War II.

She carried out 11 patrols before being sunk in the Barents Sea by British warships on 24 August 1944.

She sank one merchant ship and one warship, damaged a merchant vessel and caused a warship to be declared a total loss.

Design
German Type VIIC submarines were preceded by the shorter Type VIIB submarines. U-354 had a displacement of  when at the surface and  while submerged. She had two shafts and two  propellers.

U-354 was fitted with five  torpedo tubes (four fitted at the bow and one at the stern), fourteen torpedoes, one  SK C/35 naval gun, 220 rounds, and a  C/30 anti-aircraft gun. The boat had a complement of between forty-four and sixty.

Service history
The submarine was laid down on 15 April 1940 at the Flensburger Schiffbau-Gesellschaft yard at Flensburg as yard number 473, launched on 10 January 1942 and commissioned on 22 April under the command of Kapitänleutnant Karl-Heinz Herbschleb.

U-354 served with the 5th U-boat Flotilla, for training and then with the 1st flotilla for operations from 1 October 1942. She came under the command of the 11th flotilla on 15 October and was reassigned to the 13th flotilla on 1 June 1943; she stayed with that organization until her sinking.

U-348 made short trips from Kiel in Germany to Bergen and Skjomenfjord in Norway between April and October 1942.

First and second patrols
Her first patrol began with her departure from Skjomenfjord on 29 October 1942. On 4 November she sank the William Clark off Jan Mayen Island. This ship had already possibly been damaged by bombs from Ju 88 aircraft. A crewman was lost overboard on the 11th. The boat put into Narvik on the 30th.

The submarine's second foray over Christmas and New year's Eve took her from Narvik, as far as Bear Island and back to Narvik.

Third and fourth patrols
U-354s third patrol was marred by the suicide of Maschinenmaat Helmut Richter on 12 March 1943.

Her fourth sortie took the boat north of Bear Island; she returned to Narvik on 12 June 1943.

Fifth patrol
It was during this patrol that she attacked and damaged the Soviet Petrovskij in the eastern Kara Sea on 27 August 1943.

Sixth patrol
This patrol was split in two: the first part, which was rather brief, was over 22 and 23 October 1943. The second part was longer; between 25 October and 6 December. The boat finished up in Hammerfest in the far north of Norway.

Seventh, eighth and ninth patrols
U-354 continued to patrol northern waters, without success.

Tenth patrol
By now moored in Bogenbucht (west of Narvik), the next sally was also divided in two. The boat sailed west of Svalbard and Franz Josef Land, but targets continued to elude her.

Eleventh patrol and loss
In August 1944 U-354 was deployed to search for Murmansk convoy JW 59. On 22 August, northwest of the North Cape, she encountered a carrier group involved in Operation Goodwood, an air attack on the battleship Tirpitz.
U-354 damaged the escort carrier  with a FAT torpedo, but a second shot, intended as a 'coup de grâce', hit the frigate  which was subsequently abandoned and scuttled. Nabob was recovered to Scapa Flow, but declared to be a total loss.

Wolfpacks
U-354 took part in nine wolfpacks, namely:
 Eisbär (27 March – 1 April 1943) 
 Wiking (4 August – 15 September 1943) 
 Eisenbart (1 November – 4 December 1943) 
 Eisenbart (8 – 28 December 1943) 
 Boreas (9 – 10 March 1944) 
 Hammer (10 March – 5 April 1944) 
 Donner (5 – 11 April 1944) 
 Donner & Keil (20 April – 2 May 1944) 
 Trutz (22 – 24 August 1944)

Previously recorded fate
U-354 was originally thought to have been sunk by a Fairey Swordfish of No. 825 Naval Air Squadron from the escort carrier  on 22 August 1944.

Summary of raiding history

References

Notes

Citations

Bibliography

External links

German Type VIIC submarines
U-boats commissioned in 1942
U-boats sunk in 1944
U-boats sunk by British warships
World War II submarines of Germany
1942 ships
Ships built in Flensburg
Ships lost with all hands
World War II shipwrecks in the Arctic Ocean
Maritime incidents in August 1944